SW9 may refer to:

 EMD SW9, a locomotive
 South West 9, a 2001 British film
 Star Wars: The Rise of Skywalker, also known as Star Wars Episode IX
 SW9, the London postcode, see SW postcode area
Southwest No. 9 Boundary Marker of the Original District of Columbia

See also 
 SWIX (disambiguation)